Tansboro is an unincorporated community located within Winslow Township in Camden County, New Jersey, United States.

Edgewood Regional High School was a high school located in Tansboro. It opened in 1958 and was renamed Winslow Township High School in 2001. Some major roads in and around Tansboro include County Route 561, Route 73, and U.S. Route 30.

References

Winslow Township, New Jersey
Unincorporated communities in Camden County, New Jersey
Unincorporated communities in New Jersey